Time Inc. was an American worldwide mass media corporation founded on November 28, 1922, by Henry Luce and Briton Hadden and based in New York City. It owned and published over 100 magazine brands, including its namesake Time, Sports Illustrated, Travel + Leisure, Food & Wine, Fortune, People, InStyle, Life, Golf Magazine, Southern Living, Essence, Real Simple, and Entertainment Weekly. It also had subsidiaries which it co-operated with the UK magazine house Time Inc. UK (which was later sold and since has been rebranded to TI Media), whose major titles include What's on TV, NME, Country Life, and Wallpaper. Time Inc. also co-operated over 60 websites and digital-only titles including MyRecipes, Extra Crispy, TheSnug, HelloGiggles, and MIMI.

In 1990, Time Inc. merged with Warner Communications to form the media conglomerate Time Warner. In 2018, media company Meredith Corporation acquired Time Inc. for $2.8 billion. Meredith was then acquired by IAC and merged with Dotdash to form Dotdash Meredith three years later, thus resulting in IAC gaining most of the former Time Inc. assets.

History

Beginnings
Nightly discussions of the concept of a news magazine led its founders Henry Luce and Briton Hadden, both age 23, to quit their jobs in 1922. Later that same year, they formed Time Inc. Having raised $86,000 of a $100,000 goal, the first issue of Time was published on March 3, 1923, as the first weekly news magazine in the United States. Luce served as business manager while Hadden was editor-in-chief. Luce and Hadden annually alternated year-to-year the titles of president and secretary-treasurer. Upon Hadden's sudden death in 1929, Luce assumed Hadden's position.

Growth
Luce launched the business magazine Fortune in February 1930 and created/founded the pictorial Life magazine in 1936, and launched House & Home in 1952 and Sports Illustrated in 1954. He also produced The March of Time radio and newsreel series. By the mid-1960s, Time Inc. was the largest and most prestigious magazine publisher in the world. (Dwight Macdonald, a Fortune staffer during the 1930s, referred to him as "Il Luce", a play on the Italian dictator Benito Mussolini, who was called "Il Duce".) Once ambitious to become Secretary of State in a Republican administration, Luce wrote a famous article in Life magazine in 1941, called "The American Century", which defined the role of American foreign policy for the remainder of the 20th century, and perhaps beyond.

President Franklin D. Roosevelt, aware that most publishers were opposed to him, issued a decree in 1943 that blocked all publishers and media executives from visits to combat areas; he put General George Marshall in charge of enforcement. The main target was Luce, who had long opposed FDR.  Historian Alan Brinkley argues the move was "badly mistaken", for had Luce been allowed to travel, he would have been an enthusiastic cheerleader for American forces around the globe.  But stranded in New York City, Luce's frustration and anger expressed itself in hard-edged partisanship.  Luce, supported by Editor T. S. Matthews, appointed Whittaker Chambers as acting Foreign News editor in 1944, despite the feuds Chambers had with reporters in the field.

In the 1950s, the Time Inc. executive Brumbaugh made presentations to the Post Office Department to explain how Time Inc. was using a zoning system to speed the delivery of its magazines. Although the Post Office Department had instigated zones in 1943, they were inconsistently applied. As cited in FYI, Time Inc.’s internal newsletter “‘Fewer than 40% of the cities were properly zoned,’ he recalls. ‘I went to the Post Office Department and showed them how we were making the zone system work.’” In 1963, the United States Post Office introduced ZIP codes.

Luce, who remained editor-in-chief of all his publications until 1964, maintained a position as an influential member of the Republican Party. Holding anti-communist sentiments, he used Time to support right-wing dictatorships in the name of fighting communism.  An instrumental figure behind the so-called "China Lobby", he played a large role in steering American foreign policy and popular sentiment in favor of Nationalist leader Chiang Kai-shek and his wife Soong Mei-ling in their war against the Japanese. (The Chiangs appeared in the cover of Time eleven times between 1927 and 1955.)

Merger with Warner Communications
The merger of Time Inc. and Warner Communications was announced on March 4, 1989. During the summer of that same year, Paramount Communications (formerly Gulf+Western) launched a $12.2 billion hostile bid to acquire Time Inc. in an attempt to end a stock swap merger deal between Time and Warner Communications. This caused Time to raise its bid for Warner to $14.9 billion in cash and stock. Paramount responded by filing a lawsuit in a Delaware court to block the Time/Warner merger. The court ruled twice in favor of Time, forcing Paramount to drop both the Time acquisition and the lawsuit, and allowing the formation of the two companies' merger which was completed on January 10, 1990. Effectively, Time took over Warner, resulting in a new corporate structure and the new combined company being called "Time Warner".

The Pathfinder website was launched in 1994, with content from the Time, People and Fortune magazines. It was shut down in 1999.

In 2008, Time Inc. launched Maghound, an internet-based magazine membership service that featured approximately 300 magazine titles from both Time Inc. brands and external publishing companies. On January 19, 2010, Time Inc. acquired StyleFeeder, a personal shopping engine.

In August 2010, Time Inc. announced that Ann S. Moore, its chairman and chief executive, would step down as CEO and be replaced by Jack Griffin, an executive with Meredith Corporation, the nation's second-largest publisher of consumer magazines. In September 2010, Time Inc. entered into a licensing agreement with Kolkata-based ABP Group, one of India's largest media conglomerates, to publish Fortune India magazine and the yearly Fortune India 500 list. Griffin was ousted after a brief tenure, eventually being replaced by Laura Lang, who served about a year.

Split
On March 6, 2013, Time Warner announced plans to spin-off Time Inc. into a publicly traded company. Time Warner's chairman/CEO Jeff Bewkes said that the split would allow Time Warner to focus entirely on its television and film businesses, and Time Inc. to focus on its core print media businesses. It was announced in May 2014 that Time Inc. would become a publicly traded company on June 6 of that year. The spin-off was completed on June 9, 2014. As of September 13, 2016, Rich Battista was promoted to president and CEO, replacing Joseph A. Ripp.

Time Inc. purchased American Express Publishing Corporation's suite of titles, including Travel + Leisure, Food & Wine, Departures, Black Ink and Executive Travel on October 1, 2013. On January 14, 2014, Time Inc. announced that Colin Bodell was joining the company in the newly created position of executive vice president and chief technology officer. However, he was let go May 19, 2016 On February 5, 2014, Time Inc. announced that it was cutting 500 jobs with most of the layoffs at American Express Publishing. From April 2014 to mid-2017, the Chairman of Time Inc. was Joseph A. Ripp, who had been Chief Executive since September 2013 and continued as Executive Chairman when replaced as CEO by Battista. Though Ripp had intended to remain Executive Chairman until 2018, he wound up leaving the board in 2017 and John Fahey served as non-executive chairman for the months prior to the company's sale to Meredith. On May 28, 2015, Time Inc. announced the purchase of entertainment and sports news site FanSided. The three companies will be a part of Sports Illustrated Play.

After attempting a few TV shows in 2014 and 2015, the company formed Time Inc. Productions in 2016 as its in-house production company. On February 11, 2016, Time Inc. announced that it has acquired Viant, a leading people based marketing platform and owner of MySpace.

Meredith and IAC purchases 

In February 2017, it was reported that Meredith Corporation and a group of investors led by Edgar Bronfman Jr. were considering purchasing Time Inc. In 2016, Time Inc. acquired Bizrate Insights. On April 28, 2017, the company's board of directors dropped the plan of selling the company and instead focus on growth strategies.

On November 26, 2017, it was announced that Meredith Corporation would acquire Time Inc. in a $2.8 billion deal. $640 million in backing will be provided by Koch Equity Development, but the Koch family will not have a board seat or otherwise influence the company's operations. Prior to the sale closing in January 2018, Time Inc. sold Essence Communications to Richelieu Dennis, the founder of hair- and skin-care products maker Sundial Brands. In January 2018, Meredith removed signage and references to Time, Inc., and Time, Inc. website was redirected to the Meredith's website.

In March 2018, only six weeks after the closure of the deal, Meredith announced that it would lay off 1,200 employees, and explore the sale of Time, Fortune, Money, and Sports Illustrated. The company felt that these brands did not align with its core, lifestyle-oriented properties.

Howard Milstein had announced on February 7, 2018, that he would acquire Golf Magazine from Meredith, and Time Inc. UK was sold to the British private equity group Epiris (later rebranded to TI Media) in late February. In September 2018, Meredith announced that it would re-sell Time to Marc Benioff and his wife Lynne for $190 million. Although Benioff is the chairman and co-CEO of Salesforce.com, Time  will remain separate from the company, and Benioff will not be involved in its daily operations. In November 2018, Meredith announced to sell Fortune to Thai businessman Chatchaval Jiaravanon for $150 million. In December 2021, Meredith was acquired by IAC's Dotdash and become Dotdash Meredith.

Offices

Time'''s offices were originally in the Chrysler Building. In 1938, they moved to the seven upper floors of the newly-built 1 Rockefeller Plaza in Rockefeller Center, which was named the "Time & Life Building". In 1960, they moved to fifteen floors of a new building, also in Rockefeller Center, 1271 Avenue of the Americas, which took on the name "Time & Life Building". Time rented additional offices in the adjacent 135 West 50th Street building. In 2014, Time moved to Brookfield Place in lower Manhattan.

Leadership
In the early years, when the company was just Time'' magazine, Luce served as business manager while Hadden was editor-in-chief, and they annually alternated the positions of president and secretary-treasurer. On Hadden's sudden death in 1929 Luce took his position and business management was entrusted to Roy E. Larsen, who had been one of their first hires. Luce cultivated a philosophy of "church and state", where the editorial and business management were separate up to the board of directors level. (This was functionally ended with the departure of McManus from the Time Warner board, and formally by Ripp in 2013).

Editors-in-chief
 1929–1964 Henry Luce (then "Editorial Chairman" to his death in 1967)
 1964–1979 Hedley Donovan
 1979–1987 Henry Anatole Grunwald
 1987–1994 Jason McManus

McManus left the board of what had become Time Warner shortly before retiring, and his replacement Norman Pearlstine and successors John Huey (2006-2012) and Martha Nelson (2013) were never directors of the parent. The title was then abolished.

Presidents
 Luce (alternating with Hadden to 1929) to 1939
 1939–1960 Roy E. Larsen (then chairman executive committee to 1969,then vice chairman to shortly before his death in 1979)
 1960–1969 James A. Linen
 1969–1980 James R. Shepley
 1980–1986 J. Richard Munro
 1986–1990 Nicholas J. Nicholas Jr.

Linen became chairman of the executive committee for a time after serving as president, then was succeeded by Shepley, who retained that position for a time after he, in turn, stepped down as president.

Chairmen of the board
 1929–1942 Henry Luce
 1942–1960 Maurice T. Moore (husband of Luce's sister Elisabeth Luce Moore)
 1960–1980 Andrew Heiskell
 1980–1986 Ralph P. Davidson
 1986–1990 J. Richard Munro

Davidson also served as chairman of the executive committee after stepping down as chairman of the board.
Munro was chairman of the executive committee of Time Warner from 1990 to 1996.

Chief executive officers
 1964?–1980 Heiskell
 1980–1990 Munro
On the merger with Warner Communications Munro and then Nicholas were co-CEOs of Time Warner with Steve Ross until 1992 when Ross squeezed Nicholas out. Gerald M. Levin, who had come up through Time's non-publishing operations, succeeded Ross later that year and in 2002 was succeeded by Richard Parsons who had never been connected to legacy Time Inc. (his successor Jeff Bewkes, leader of the parent when Time Inc. was spun off, had like Levin come from the non-publishing operations).

Heads of Time within a parent
The Time, Inc. (the comma remained part of the formal title until the Warner merger but the company ceased to use it in 1933) corporate entity diversified out of publishing in the 1970s and 1980s, purchasing what was later spun off as Temple-Inland paper company and various broadcasting and cable television operations such as HBO and what became Time Warner Cable. As the distinction between the overall corporation and the magazine operation grew, the position that had been "Group Vice President, Magazines" or "Executive Vice President, Magazines" became president and chief executive of a "magazine group" in 1985 (under Kelso F. Sutton to 1986,and then Reginald K. Brack Jr.) and then became president and CEO of a newly incorporated subsidiary,"The Time Inc. Magazine Company" in 1988 (initially with John A. Meyers as chairman). In 1992, Time Warner reorganized so that the non-magazine parts of Time Inc. came directly under the parent and the Time Inc. name was downgraded to only include the magazine company, so the officers of the "Magazine Company" became the officers of what was now Time Inc. Later that year, CEO Brack shifted to chairman with Don Logan as president; he stepped down in favor of Logan as CEO in 1994 and chairman in 1997. Logan moved up to a group oversight position including additional Time Warner operations in 2002 (Ann S. Moore succeeding him at the magazine operation) and left the company in 2005. Leaders after Moore are noted above.

References

Bibliography

External links 

 

1922 establishments in New York (state)
2018 disestablishments in New York (state)
2018 mergers and acquisitions
American companies established in 1922
American companies disestablished in 2018
Companies formerly listed on the New York Stock Exchange
Corporate spin-offs
Former Time Warner subsidiaries
Magazine publishing companies of the United States
Meredith Corporation
IAC (company)
Publishing companies established in 1922
Publishing companies disestablished in 2018